R22  may refer to:

Roads 
 R22 road (Belgium)
 R-22 regional road (Montenegro)
 R22 highway (Russia)
 R22 (South Africa)

Vessels 
 , a destroyer of the Royal Navy
 , an aircraft carrier of the Indian Navy
 , a submarine of the United States Navy

Other uses 
 R22 (New York City Subway car)
 Chlorodifluoromethane, a refrigerant
 Fiat R.22, an Italian reconnaissance aircraft
 Ndonga dialect
 R22: Harmful if swallowed, a risk phrase
 R-22 Spearhead, a fictional starfighter in the Star Wars universe
 Robinson R22, an American helicopter